Patryk Bryła (born 4 March 1990) is a Polish professional footballer who plays as a winger for Zagłębie Sosnowiec.

Career

Club
In August 2011, he was loaned to KS Polkowice on a one-year deal.

On 29 July 2020 he joined Chrobry Głogów on a one-year contract.

References

External links
 
 

1990 births
Footballers from Kraków
Living people
Polish footballers
Association football midfielders
Zagłębie Lubin players
KS Polkowice players
Okocimski KS Brzesko players
ŁKS Łódź players
Bruk-Bet Termalica Nieciecza players
Chrobry Głogów players
Zagłębie Sosnowiec players
Ekstraklasa players
I liga players
II liga players